Samira Bawumia (née Ramadan) (born 20 August 1980) is a Ghanaian politician and the Second Lady of the Republic of Ghana. She is married to the Vice President of Ghana, Mahamudu Bawumia.

Education
Samira began her early education at the Answarudeen Islamic School at Fadama and Alsyd Academy in Accra, before continuing to the Akosombo International School (AIS) and then to Mfantsiman Girls' Secondary School at Saltpond in the Central Region of Ghana.

Following her admission to Kwame Nkrumah University of Science and Technology (KNUST), she studied BA. Social Science in Law and Sociology and Technology. At the Ghana Institute of Management and Public Administration (GIMPA), where she had her postgraduate studies, she was awarded the Best Student in Master of Business Administration (MBA).

She is a multi-lingua, fluent in  Ewe, Ga, Twi, Fanti and Mamprusi

Recognition
Mrs. Bawumia was recently made an Ambassador for the Global Alliance for Clean Cookstoves and joins the late former UN Secretary General Kofi Annan, Academy Award-winning actor Julia Roberts, and Grammy-nominated Ghanaian musician Rocky Dawuni to work with the Alliance and its partners to raise awareness of household air pollution and encourage broader adoption of clean cooking solutions in developing countries in a bid to create cleaner environments and eradicate deaths caused by pollution from the burning of solid fuels for cooking. In 2019, she was acknowledged as the first of seven individuals honored by Sustainable Energy for All (SEforAll) in conjunction with Ashden. This was in recognition for her efforts towards the United Nations' Sustainable Development Goal (SDG) 7, which is to ensure access to modern reliable, renewable and affordable energy for all by 2030.

Humanitarian initiatives 
Samira is the founder and CEO of the Samira Empowerment & Humanitarian Projects (SEHP), described as a not-for-profit organisation established with the purpose of empowering the underprivileged in Ghana through diverse social intervention projects to improve lives. In November 2019, she donated library books to Police Basic Schools in the country to inculcate the habit of reading in children. This was an initiative of her 'Library in the box' project which has the objective of making books available to schools. She also started the Samira Bawumia literature prize.The annual literacy prize for young Ghanaians between the ages of 15 and 25 is aimed at providing young creative and writers with an opportunity to share their art with the world. The first winners of the Samira Bawumia Literature Prize were crowned at the Fitzgerald in Accra on Monday, July 27, 2020.

Personal life 
Samira is married to the Vice President of Ghana, Mahamadu Bawumia

Awards 
In May 2022, Samira received the Ghanaian Women Association of Georgia Global Humanitarian Award for her interventions in maternal and child health, women empowerment and education in the USA. She also received an honor from the Atlanta City Council and also recognized by the Macon-Bibb County.

References

External links
"Learn From Those Who Are Doing Well" – Samira Bawumia

Living people
Second ladies of Ghana
21st-century Ghanaian women politicians
New Patriotic Party politicians
Ghanaian Muslims
Ghanaian Zongo people
Ghana Institute of Management and Public Administration alumni
Kwame Nkrumah University of Science and Technology alumni
Mfantsiman Girls' Secondary School alumni
1980 births